William Croke may refer to:

 William Joseph Croke, Canadian politician (1840–1869)
 William Croke (English politician) (died c. 1401)

See also
William Crooke (disambiguation)
William Crook (disambiguation)